En Concierto... Inolvidable (In concert... Unforgettable) is the title of second live album by Spanish singer Rocío Dúrcal, released on 22 October 2002 by BMG Music and Ariola Records. Produced by Argentinean songwriter Bebu Silvetti.

It was recorded on 19 September 2002 during her concert made in the National Auditorium in Mexico City. It includes two songs never recorded before by the artist: "Eres Único" written by Armando Manzanero and "Hasta Que Vuelvas" written by Kike Santander, this last was released as single. Together with the CD, it was released a music video (in format DVD) with the entire concert. For this recording the artist received a Latin Grammy nomination on 2003 for Best Ranchero Album.

Track listing 
CD track list

DVD track list

Accolades 
Latin Grammy Award

Charts 
Billboard Albums

Certifications

Credits and personnel 
Musicians
Rocío Dúrcal – (vocals)
 Juan Carlos Giron, Eric Mora and Manny Lopez – (guitar)
 Bernardino De Santiago – (guitarrón)
 Jose Guadalupe Alfaro – (vihuela)
 Karen Dixon – (flute)
 Alfredo Oliva – (concertina)
 Robert Weiner – (oboe)
 Trevor Newman, Levi Mora Arriaga, Jason Carder, Jim Hacker – (trumpet)
 John David Smith and Dwayne Dixon – (horn)
 Dana Teboe, John Kricker – (trombone)
 Bebu Silvetti – (piano)
 Julio Hernandez – (bass)
 Richard Bravo – (percussion)
 Susana De Las Heras – (vocals)

Production
 Producer, arranger, direction and production: Bebu Silvetti.
 Production and coordination: Arturo De Las Heras.
 Engineer: Juan Carlos Pastrana.
 Mixing engineer and digital editing: Boris Milan.
 Production management: Gabriela Caspian.
 Art direction and composition: Antonio Morales.
 Direction: Adrián Posse.
 Musical director: Omar Guzman.
 Coordination: Sylvia Silvetti.
 Copista: Eugenio Vanderhorst.
 Assistant: Javier Villalvaso, Alejandro Sánchez, Oscar Florez.
 Recorded at: National Auditorium, Mexico City.
 Recording studios: Castle Recording Studios, Miami, Florida; The Hit Factory Criteria, Miami, Florida; Neo Audio Studios, Mexico.
 Graphic design: Alberto Carballo.
 Photographers: Juan Carlos Equihua, Adolfo Pérez Butron, Carlos Somonte.
 Makeup: Javier De La Rosa.
 Label: BMG Music & Ariola Records.
 Distributed by:  Ariola International.

References 

2002 live albums
Rocío Dúrcal live albums
Spanish-language live albums
Albums produced by Bebu Silvetti